Badr Gunba (born 1981) was the Minister for Culture and the Preservation of Historical and Cultural Heritage of Abkhazia from 2011 until 2014. He was appointed by newly elected President Alexander Ankvab on 13 October 2011. Following the May 2014 revolution and the election of President Raul Khajimba, Gunba was replaced as minister by Elvira Arsalia.

He was elected as Vice President of Abkhazia as the running mate of Aslan Bzhania in the 2020 presidential elections.

References

Living people
Vice presidents of Abkhazia
Ministers for Culture of Abkhazia
1981 births
Saratov State Agrarian University alumni